Gert Frischmuth (18 July 1932 – 4 May 2012) was a German choral conductor and music educator.

Life 
Born in Jena, Frischmuth studied music education at the Friedrich Schiller University of Jena. After twelve years of teaching at the Humboldt-Oberschule in Erfurt, he was appointed to the Hochschule für Musik Franz Liszt, Weimar for the subject of choral singing/choral conducting after additional studies in choral conducting. There he successfully directed, among other things, the chamber choir of the conservatoire, which won several awards. In 1979, he was appointed a Professor. In 1988, after twelve years as guest conductor and two years as interim leader, he was appointed choir director of the Leipzig Radio Choir, later to become the MDR Rundfunkchor. He led the choir until 1998, and under his direction it developed into one of the top choirs in Europe.

Frischmuth died in Erfurt at the age of 79.

Students
 Volkher Häusler, Conductor and choirmaster
 Hubert Hoche, Conductor and composer
 Markus Teutschbein, Conductor and choirmaster
 Christian Frank, Conductor and composer

Awards 
 Two 1st prizes as choral conductor at the singing competition of the Erfurt district at Wartburg
  2003

References

External links 
 
 

German choral conductors
German music educators
Recipients of the Cross of the Order of Merit of the Federal Republic of Germany
1932 births
2012 deaths
Musicians from Jena